Replication timing quantitative trait loci (or rtQTL) are genetic variations that lead to a differential use of replication origins, exhibiting allele-specific effects on replication timing. Originally, 16 rtQTL were found in an analysis of human genomes.

References

Mutation